Rancho Guajome Adobe is a historic 19th-century hacienda (and now a historic house museum) in Rancho Guajome Adobe County Park, on North Santa Fe Avenue in Vista, San Diego County, California.  Built in 1852–53, it is a well-preserved but late example of Spanish-Mexican colonial architecture, and was designated a National Historic Landmark in 1970.  It is also a California Historical Landmark and on the National Register of Historic Places.

Description
Rancho Guajome Adobe is located in the northwestern part of Vista, on the south side of North Santa Fe Avenue.  It is located just east of Guajome County Park, a larger park on the north side of the road.  The adobe complex includes the main house, around which are arrayed a number of outbuildings.  The main house is a large, rambling, 20-room, Spanish Colonial-style hacienda with two courtyards, and an arcaded veranda.  The outbuildings include stables, a blacksmith shop, chapel, and carriage house.

History
The adobe was built in 1852 and served as the headquarters of Rancho Guajome, a Mexican land grant. Abel Stearns had given the rancho to Ysidora Bandini (sister of his wife Arcadia Bandini), as a wedding gift when she married Lieutenant Cave Johnson Couts in 1851.  It was built with the profits from the cattle boom of the 1850s, when many California ranchos supplied the Gold Rush miners and associated new American immigrants with meat and leather.

Couts was appointed sub-agent for the native Luiseño people (San Luis Rey Mission Indians) in 1853. He used their labor to improve his properties in the area, including this one and nearby Rancho Buena Vista and Rancho Vallecitos de San Marcos.

Beginning in the 1970s, the county undertook a major rehabilitation of the property, which was completed in 1996.  It is now the centerpiece of a county park  in size.  Guided and self-guided tours are available, and the park facilities are available for special events.

See also
List of National Historic Landmarks in California - federal
National Register of Historic Places listings in San Diego County, California — federal
California Historical Landmarks in San Diego County, California — state
Index — Ranchos of San Diego County, California
List of Ranchos of California

References

External links

San Diego Parks - Rancho Guajome Adobe

G
Houses completed in 1853
Houses in San Diego County, California
Historic house museums in California
Museums in San Diego County, California
Parks in San Diego County, California
California Historical Landmarks
National Historic Landmarks in California
Houses on the National Register of Historic Places in California
National Register of Historic Places in San Diego County, California
History of San Diego County, California
Vista, California